The 1935 Virginia Cavaliers football team represented the University of Virginia during the 1935 college football season. The Cavaliers were led by second-year head coach Gus Tebell and played their home games at Scott Stadium in Charlottesville, Virginia. They competed as members of the Southern Conference, finishing with a conference record of 0–3–2 and a 1–5–4 record overall.

Schedule

References

Virginia
Virginia Cavaliers football seasons
Virginia Cavaliers football